HMS M32 was an M29-class monitor of the Royal Navy.

The availability of ten 6 inch Mk XII guns from the Queen Elizabeth-class battleships in 1915 prompted the Admiralty to order five scaled down versions of the M15-class monitors, which had been designed to use 9.2 inch guns.  HMS M32 and her sisters were ordered from Harland & Wolff, Belfast in March 1915.  However, HMS M32 and her sister HMS M33 were sub-contracted to the nearby Workman Clark Limited shipyard. Launched on 22 May 1915, she was completed in June 1915.

Upon completion, HMS M32 was sent to the Mediterranean. She later took part in the Battle of Jaffa and remained there until March, 1919.  She served from May to September 1919 in support of British and White Russian forces in the White Sea, before returning to England.

HMS M32 was sold on 29 January 1920 for use as an oil tanker, and named Ampat.

References 
 Dittmar, F. J. & Colledge, J. J., "British Warships 1914-1919", (Ian Allan, London, 1972), 
 Gray, Randal (ed), "Conway's All the World's Fighting Ships 1906–1921", (Conway Maritime Press, London, 1985), 

 

M29-class monitors
Ships built in Belfast
1915 ships
World War I monitors of the United Kingdom
Royal Navy ship names
Ships built by Harland and Wolff